Mary Alice Crabill Patterson (February 8, 1927 – November 11, 2016) was an American singer and politician.

Biography
Born in Council Bluffs, Iowa on February 8, 1927, to Jacob and Mary Emmaline Crabill, Mary Alice Crabill earned her bachelor's degree from the University of Sioux Falls. She obtained a Master of Arts degree from University of Nebraska–Lincoln and received a doctorate from the University of Colorado–Boulder. Crabill met Perry Patterson in 1949, and married him in 1954. The couple returned to South Dakota, and both taught at the University of Sioux Falls. Mary Patterson later joined the faculty of the University of South Dakota, and Augustana University. She served on the South Dakota House of Representatives from 1999 to 2000. Patterson contested the 2000 and 2004 state house elections, losing both times.

References

1927 births
2016 deaths
American contraltos
Democratic Party members of the South Dakota House of Representatives
People from Council Bluffs, Iowa
Politicians from Sioux Falls, South Dakota
Women state legislators in South Dakota
University of Sioux Falls alumni
University of Sioux Falls people
University of Colorado Boulder alumni
University of Nebraska–Lincoln alumni
University of South Dakota faculty
Augustana University people
American women academics
21st-century American women